is a professional Japanese baseball player. He plays pitcher for the Hiroshima Toyo Carp.

External links

NPB.com

1989 births
Living people
Baseball people from Tochigi Prefecture
Japanese baseball players
Nippon Professional Baseball pitchers
Yokohama BayStars players
Yokohama DeNA BayStars players
Hokkaido Nippon-Ham Fighters players
Hiroshima Toyo Carp players